Cheakamus Lake is a lake in Garibaldi Provincial Park on the southeastern outskirts of the resort municipality of Whistler, British Columbia. It has an area of 5.7 km2 (2.2 mi2).  It is an expansion of the upper Cheakamus River, with the river entering it at its east end and exiting at the west end.

In 2005, 40,000 litres of sodium hydroxide were spilled into the Cheakamus River, well downstream of the lake, as a result of a CN train derailment.

References

Lakes of British Columbia
Sea-to-Sky Corridor
New Westminster Land District